Lee Sang-hoon (Korean: 이상훈; born 1959) is a Republic of Korea Marine Corps officer who served as the Commandant of the Corps from 2015 April 13th to 2017 April 13th.

He is a 1982 graduate of the Republic of Korea Naval Academy and attained a master's degree in government from the University of Suwon in 2001.

References

1959 births
living people
South Korean generals
Republic of Korea Marine Corps personnel